Kid Cudi (born Scott Ramon Seguro Mescudi) is a Grammy Award winning American recording artist from Shaker Heights, Ohio. After the release of his breakout mixtape A Kid Named Cudi in July 2008, he soon became the protégé of fellow rapper and music producer Kanye West. He released two studio albums on the Dream On, GOOD Music and Universal Motown record labels: Man on the Moon: The End of Day (2009) and Man on the Moon II: The Legend of Mr. Rager (2010). In February 2011, Cudi announced the dissolvement of Dream On, and would subsequently launch a new imprint, Wicked Awesome Records.

Kid Cudi earned his first three Grammy Award nominations in 2010, two for his single "Day 'n' Nite" and one for the collaboration "Make Her Say." In 2012, he won two Grammy Awards for "All of the Lights," a collaboration with Kanye West, Rihanna and Fergie. The release of Cudi's debut album and its lead single "Day 'n' Nite, led to several more honors, including an MTV Video Music Award (VMA). During 2010, Cudi won a Beatport Music Award, as well as an Urban Music Award. In 2011, he was nominated for an additional four VMAs, which he shared with West and Rihanna, and has been nominated for a total of twenty accolades.

In 2021, Cudi appeared in the film Don't Look Up, directed and written by Adam McKay, playing the character DJ Chello. For his role in the film, as well as for his contributions to the film's song, "Just Look Up", written and performed by Cudi and Ariana Grande, he has received numerous nominations, including a Critics Choice Award and a Screen Actors Guild Award.

African-American Film Critics Association
The African-American Film Critics Association (AAFCA) is an annual awards show created by Dick Clark in 1973. Kid Cudi has won one award from one nomination.

American Music Awards
The American Music Awards are an annual awards show created by Dick Clark in 1973. Kid Cudi received one nomination.

BET

BET Awards
Established in 2001 by the Black Entertainment Television (BET) network to celebrate African Americans and other minorities in music, acting, sports, and other fields of entertainment, the awards are presented annually and broadcast live on BET. Cudi has been nominated once.

BET Hip Hop Awards
The BET Hip Hop Awards for hip-hop performers, producers, and music video directors were established in 2006 and are hosted by the BET Hip-Hop network. Cudi has received one award from seven nominations.

Beatport Music Awards
With its nominees based solely on Beatport sales data, The Beatport Music Awards aim to recognize electronic music talent. Cudi has won one award from one nomination.

Black Reel Awards
The Black Reel Awards, or BRAs, is an annual American awards ceremony hosted by the Foundation for the Augmentation of African-Americans in Film (FAAAF) to recognize excellence of African Americans, as well as the cinematic achievements of the African diaspora, in the global film industry, as assessed by the foundation’s voting membership. Kid Cudi has received one nomination.

CCA

Critics' Choice Celebration of Black Cinema Awards
The Celebration of Black Cinema and Television is an annual ceremony presented by the Canadian American Critics Choice Association (CCA) to honor the cinematic achievements of African American artists. From the event Kid Cudi has won one award.

Critics' Choice Movie Awards
The Critics' Choice Movie Awards is an awards show presented annually by the American-Canadian Critics Choice Association (CCA) to honor the finest in cinematic achievement. Kid Cudi has been nominated three times.

Grammy Awards
The Grammy Awards are awarded annually by the National Academy of Recording Arts and Sciences of the United States. Cudi has been nominated six times and has won twice.

{|class="wikitable"
!Year
!Nominated work
!Award
!Result
|-
|rowspan="3"|2010
|rowspan="2"|"Day 'n' Nite"
|Best Rap Solo Performance
|
|-
|Best Rap Song
|
|-
|"Make Her Say" (featuring Common and Kanye West) 
|Best Rap Performance By A Duo Or Group
|
|-
|rowspan="2"|2012
|rowspan="2"|"All of the Lights" (with Kanye West, Rihanna and Fergie)
|Best Rap/Sung Collaboration
|
|-
|Best Rap Song
|
|-
| 2022
| Donda (as featured artist and songwriter)
|Album of the Year
|

Hollywood Music in Media Awards
The Hollywood Music in Media Awards (HMMA) is an award organization honoring original music (Song and Score) in all forms visual media including film, TV, video games, trailers, commercial advertisements, documentaries, music videos and special programs. Cudi has received one award from two nominations.

MTV

MTV Movie & TV Awards

The MTV Movie & TV Awards (formerly the MTV Movie Awards) is a film and television awards show presented annually on MTV. The first MTV Movie Awards were presented in 1992. The ceremony was renamed the MTV Movie & TV Awards for its 26th edition in 2017 to also honor work in television as well as film.

MTV Video Music Awards
The MTV Video Music Awards (VMA) were established in 1984 by MTV to celebrate the top music videos of the year. Cudi has been nominated six times.

MTVU Woodie Awards 
A division of Viacom's MTV Networks, the channel MTVU has hosted its own awards show named mtvU Woodie Awards since 2006. He has been nominated once.

NAACP Image Awards

The NAACP Image Awards is an annual awards ceremony presented by the U.S.-based National Association for the Advancement of Colored People (NAACP) to honor outstanding performances in film, television, theatre, music, and literature.

|-
|rowspan="1"|2022
|rowspan="1"|The Harder They Fall Soundtrack (as featured artist and songwriter)
|rowspan="1"| Outstanding Soundtrack/Compilation Album
|
|-
|rowspan="2"|2023
|rowspan="1"| Scott Mescudi (story by), Ian Edelman, Maurice Williams – Entergalactic
|rowspan="1"| Outstanding Writing in a Television Movie or Special
|
|-
|rowspan="1"|Entergalactic
|rowspan="1"| Outstanding Soundtrack/Compilation Album
|
|-

Screen Actors Guild Awards
The Screen Actors Guild Awards (also known as SAG Awards) are accolades given by the Screen Actors Guild-American Federation of Television and Radio Artists (SAG-AFTRA). The award was founded in 1952 to recognize outstanding performances in movie and prime time television.

Society of Composers & Lyricists Awards
The Society of Composers & Lyricists is an organization founded in 1983 to represent composers and lyricists working in visual media, such as television and film. Since 2020, the Society of Composers & Lyricists has presented annual awards for music in film, television, and other media. Kid Cudi has received one award.

Teen Choice Awards 
Presented annually by Fox Broadcasting Company since 1999, the Teen Choice Awards honors the year's biggest achievements in fields such as movies, music, television and fashion and is viewer-voted. The rapper has received a single nomination.

Urban Music Awards
The British Urban Music Awards were launched in 2003 to recognize the achievement of urban artists, producers, nightclubs, DJs, radio stations, and record labels. Cudi has won one award from two nominations.

References

External links
 Official website

Cleveland-related lists
Kid Cudi
Awards